Martin Milec (born 20 September 1991) is a Slovenian footballer who plays for Slovenian PrvaLiga side Maribor. Although primarily a right-back, he can also play as a midfielder.

Club career
Milec began his career at the age of six at local club Rače, and then joined Aluminij after a few months. He made his senior debut for Aluminij at the age of 17.

In July 2010, he signed a four-year contract with Slovenian PrvaLiga club Maribor. In the 2013–14 PrvaLiga season, he was chosen as the best young footballer of the league.

In June 2014, after four years with Maribor, Milec signed for Belgian top division side Standard Liège.

On 6 August 2017, Milec returned to Maribor on a three-year contract.

International career
Throughout his career, Milec was a member of the Slovenian youth selections and represented Slovenia under-19 at the 2009 UEFA Under-19 Championship. He also played for the Slovenian under-21 team. He has been capped eight times for the senior squad between 2013 and 2022.

Personal life
A native of Podova, Milec is a lifelong fan of NK Maribor, a club he played for, and regularly attended Maribor's matches as a child.

References

External links

NZS profile 

1991 births
Living people
Sportspeople from Maribor
Slovenian footballers
Association football fullbacks
NK Aluminij players
NK Maribor players
Standard Liège players
Roda JC Kerkrade players
Slovenian Second League players
Slovenian PrvaLiga players
Belgian Pro League players
Eredivisie players
Slovenian expatriate footballers
Slovenian expatriate sportspeople in Belgium
Expatriate footballers in Belgium
Slovenian expatriate sportspeople in the Netherlands
Expatriate footballers in the Netherlands
Slovenia youth international footballers
Slovenia under-21 international footballers
Slovenia international footballers